Operation Tiberius was an official internal Metropolitan Police investigation, commissioned in October 2001, written in 2002, but leaked to The Independent newspaper in 2014. The Metropolitan Police have acknowledged it was born of other investigations, but describe it as a new strategic approach to corruption, rather than a single operation.

The Parliamentary Home Affairs Committee has published a redacted copy of a summary of the investigation, with a lengthy annexe detailing other earlier corruption investigations, especially Operation Russell. It investigated the charge that certain "organised criminals" were able to infiltrate Scotland Yard by bribery. 19 former and 42 then serving officers were investigated for alleged corruption. It has been claimed that the Metropolitan Police suffered “endemic corruption” and given the small number of convictions, doubt has been expressed over whether this police force has extirpated the problem.

According to The Independent, the gangs used their contacts inside Freemasonry to “recruit corrupted officers”. The report concluded that this was one of “the most difficult aspects of organised crime corruption to proof against”.

Allegations of evidence tampering, interference with the pursuit of criminal suspects by other forces, and close cooperation between senior police officers and master criminals, particularly those involved in illicit drugs and prostitution, have been raised. Charges that jurors were bought off or threatened to return not-guilty verdicts, corrupt individuals working for HMRC, both in the UK and overseas, and “get out of jail free cards” being bought for £50,000 are also cited in the report.

John Palmer ('Goldfinger') protected by corrupt officers

One of the highest-ranking gangsters in the UK, John Palmer, was alleged by The Times, based on Operation Tiberius files, to have been protected from arrest and investigation by a clique of high-ranking corrupt Metropolitan Police officers. Palmer's companions were once discovered with a silenced Uzi submachine gun and 380 rounds of ammunition.

Panorama (BBC programme)
On 29 February 2016, the BBC screened an edition of Panorama entitled "Cops, Criminals, Corruption: The Inside Story". It covered police corruption, including material uncovered by Operation Tiberius. However, there was no mention of the manner in which contacts were established and maintained between senior police officers and criminals. In particular, there was no mention of the involvement of Freemasonry, in contrast to The Independent article and what had been leaked from the Operation Tiberius report.

See also
 Operation Othona
 David Hunt (gangster)

References

External links
 

Corruption in England
Police misconduct in England
Criminal justice ethics
Scandals in England
Freemasonry
Metropolitan Police operations